From Earth to Heaven is a collection of seventeen scientific essays by American writer and scientist Isaac Asimov. It was the fifth of a series of books collecting essays from The Magazine of Fantasy and Science Fiction. It was first published by Doubleday & Company in 1966.

Contents

"Harmony in Heaven" (F&SF, February 1965)
"Oh, East is West and West is East—" (March 1965)
"The Certainty of Uncertainty" (April 1965)
"To Tell a Chemist" (May 1965)
"Future? Tense!" (June 1965)
"Exclamation Point!" (July 1965)
"Behind the Teacher's Back" (August 1965)
"Death in the Laboratory" (September 1965)
"The Land of Mu" (October 1965)
"Squ-u-u-ush!" (November 1965)
"Water, Water, Everywhere—" (December 1965)
"The Proton-Reckoner" (January 1966)
"Up and Down the Earth" (February 1966)
"The Rocks of Damocles" (March 1966)
"The Nobelmen of Science" (April 1966)
"Time and Tide" (May 1966)
"The Isles of Earth" (June 1966)

External links
Asimovonline.com

Essay collections by Isaac Asimov
1966 books
Works originally published in The Magazine of Fantasy & Science Fiction
Doubleday (publisher) books